Ho Kwok Chuen (born 20 February 1977 in Hong Kong) is a Hong Kong professional footballer who currently plays for Hong Kong Premier League club Resources Capital. He is also the goalkeeping coach of the club.

Club career

Sun Hei
Due to a lack of players at Sun Hei in the 2011–12 Hong Kong FA Cup match against Rangers, Ho played as a midfielder. Rangers' Head coach Ricardo said he had no option left. The match ended 2–0 to Rangers.

Resources Capital
Ho became the eldest registered player in the 2020–21 HKPL season.

Honours

Individual
2010 East Asian Football Championship Preliminary Competition: Best Goalkeeper

Career statistics

Club
As of 20 September 2009

International

References

External links

1977 births
Living people
Hong Kong footballers
Hong Kong international footballers
Association football goalkeepers
Hong Kong Premier League players
Hong Kong First Division League players
Citizen AA players
South China AA players
Hong Kong FC players
Eastern Sports Club footballers
Sun Hei SC players
TSW Pegasus FC players
Resources Capital FC players